Ifedayo is one of the 30 local government areas of Osun State in southwestern Nigeria. It is one of the most recent local government areas to be created.

Its headquarters are in the town of Oke-Ila Orangun.

It has an area of 128 km2 and a population of 37,058 at the 2006 census.

The postal code of the area is 234.

The people of Ifedayo consist of the Igbomina (or Ogbonna) sub-ethnic group of the Yoruba.
There are several other small towns and villages in the local government area, most of which lie west of Oke-Ila Orangun

Traditional Institution 
Notable paramount rulers in ifedayo Local Government include; The Orangun of Oke-Ila, HRH Oba Adedokun Omoniyi Abolarin; The Asaooni of Ora-Igbomina, Oba Tinuoye Atolagbe and the Akesin of Ora-Igbomina, Oba Samuel Oladoye Idowu.

Tourism

Ayinkunugba Waterfalls 
Ayinkunugba Waterfalls is located in Oke-Ila Orangun Ifedayo local government. The waterfalls is over 80m high and it is the opposite of Olumirin Waterfall where you climb to appreciate it, but in Ayinkunugba, people will descend to discover the wonderful work of nature that is in the beautiful landscape of mountains, caves and trees.

Ayinkunugba Waterfalls was discovered by a hunter who shot a strange animal called Kunugba. The shot animal rolled down and the hunter searched but could not find it, instead, discovered waterfalls and named it: Ayinkunugba (Where an animal Nugba, rolled and died).

Notable indigenes 
 (Professor) Olusola Adeyeye – former senator for Osun Central Senatorial District in the Upper Chamber of National Assembly, Abuja.
 (Hon.) Idowu Samuel Abiodun – the managing director, Center Point Hotel, Osogbo and annex in Oke-Ila Orangun, current chairman of Ifedayo LGA. Oke-Ila Orangun.
 (Surv.) T.J. Atolagbe – (Retired) Permanent Secretary, Osun State Government and the Asaooni of Ora Kingdom.
 (Chief) David Adeyeye Osundina – Asiwaju of Oke-Ila Orangun and first elected chairman of Ifedayo Local Government, Oke-Ila Orangun.
 (Omooba) 'Kunle Ayantoye – former CEO of Lepec Shipping Limited, Lagos and the immediate past chairman of Ifedayo LGA, Oke-Ila Orangun.

References

Local Government Areas in Osun State